Georgios Firos (born 8 November 1953) is a Greek football manager and former football player.

Career
Born in Evosmos, Thessaloniki, Firos played center-back or sweeper. He was one of the very few players that was consistent in every game played. He played for the team of Aris Thessaloniki for many years and finished his career with Iraklis Thessaloniki.

Firos made a total of 353 appearances in the Greek Soccer Championship. He also has 52 appearances with the Greece national football team between 1974 and 1982.

He later became a manager.

References

External links

1953 births
Living people
Footballers from Thessaloniki
Greek footballers
Association football defenders
Aris Thessaloniki F.C. players
Iraklis Thessaloniki F.C. players
Greece international footballers
UEFA Euro 1980 players
Super League Greece players
Greek football managers
Agrotikos Asteras F.C. managers

Levadiakos F.C. managers
Aris Thessaloniki F.C. managers
Athlitiki Enosi Larissa F.C. managers
Panelefsiniakos F.C. managers
PAS Giannina F.C. managers
Xanthi F.C. managers
Apollon Pontou FC managers
OFI Crete F.C. managers
A.O. Kerkyra managers
Thrasyvoulos F.C. managers
Niki Volos F.C. managers
Diagoras F.C. managers
Iraklis Psachna F.C. managers
Pierikos F.C. managers
Aiginiakos F.C. managers